The Naval Small Craft Instruction and Technical Training School (NAVSCIATTS) is one of the three original Panama Canal Area Military Schools. The school house now is located at John C. Stennis Space Center in the state of Mississippi.

History 
NAVSCIATTS traces its history to the U.S. Coast Guard Mobile Training Team (MTT) sent to the Panama Canal Zone as a result of agreements made during the Alliance for Progress Conference in San José, Costa Rica in 1961. During this initial deployment, the need for a permanent training facility was recognized and the U.S. Coast Guard based the Small Craft Inspection and Training Team (SCIATT) at the U.S. Naval Station, Rodman, Panama in May 1963. Operation of the team was transferred to the U.S. Navy in June 1969 and it was re-designated as the Small Craft Instruction and Technical Team. As a result of increased training demands, NAVSCIATTS was officially established as a Naval shore activity in October 1982 and formally established as a Naval shore command in July 1983.

The closure of U.S. based facilities in the Republic of Panama (Torrijos-Carter Treaties) has resulted in the relocation of NAVSCIATTS to the John C. Stennis Space Center in the state of Mississippi. Possessing riverine and coastal training areas, John C. Stennis Space Center provides an ideal training area for NAVSCIATTS. The Pearl River (Mississippi-Louisiana) runs through Stennis Space Center.

Courses
The school presently offers the below formal courses of instruction in both Spanish and English at various times throughout the year. Many courses are taught by several select members of the US Navy's Civil Engineer Corps, SEALs, and members of Special Warfare Combatant-craft Crewmen force.

Patrol Craft Operations in a Riverine Environment: (PCOR) Eight-week course consists of instruction in patrol craft familiarization, first aid, mission planning, navigation, weapons training and tactics, patrol craft movement and formations. A riverine and medical training exercise is conducted to ensure that all students have accomplished course objectives.
Patrol Craft Propulsion Systems Overhaul: Eight-week course consists of detailed instruction in the 6Vseries 92 TA Detroit Diesel engine specifications and characteristics, operating principles, lubrication, cooling, air and fuel systems. Training includes a complete overhaul including disassembly, troubleshooting, inspection, cleaning, repair, tune-up and reassembly of the rebuilt engine, Twin Disc transmission maintenance, service and the practical application techniques to include an engine tune-up on a Caterpillar Inc. 3126 Diesel engine. In addition, students will learn tools and their uses, precision measuring instruments and shop safety.
Patrol Craft Hull Maintenance: Eight-week course consists of instruction in hand tools, oxyacetylene welding and cutting, electric arc welding, aluminum MIG welding, fiberglass repair, and inflatable boat repair. Practical applications of techniques are employed in all areas of instruction to accomplish course objectives.
Outboard Motor Maintenance and Overhaul: Eight-week course consists of engineering fundamentals, internal combustion theory, electrical and fuel systems, gear case and power head overhaul. Practical application techniques train the student to reference the manufacturer's technical manual utilizing Bombardier 150HP outboard motors as training aids.
Patrol Craft Weapons Maintenance: Four-week course consists of instruction in various individual small arms and patrol craft mounted weapons to include the M-1911A1 and P-226 pistols; M-14, M16 and AK-47 rifles; Mossberg 500A1 shotgun; M79 and M203 grenade launchers; M-60E, M2 HB .50 and MK-19 MOD3 M2 machine guns; weapon and ammunition fundamentals. Practical application techniques include malfunction analysis, disassembly, inspection, cleaning, and troubleshooting on all weapons is employed to accomplish course objectives.
Instructor Development Course: Two-week course consists of planning learning objectives, development of lesson topic guides, methods and techniques of instruction, and effective classroom communication with an emphasis on practical applications. Students will give a minimum of six practical oral presentations that will be video taped and critiqued by the instructors and classmates.
Rule of Law and Disciplined Military Operations: This one-week course includes considerations of such fundamental concerns as rules of engagement, laws of armed conflict and the role of a military law justice system in accomplishing military objectives.

See also
US Navy Small Craft Training Center of World War II

References

External links

Official website
Videos on NAVSCIATTS training of Iraqi Police Forces
wdsu.com
cnn.com
Navy News

United States Naval Special Warfare Command
United States Navy schools and training